The Future Series Costa Rica International is an international badminton tournament to be held for the first time in Cartago, Costa Rica. The event is part of the Badminton World Federation's Future Series and part of the Badminton Pan America's Circuit.

Past winners

References

External links
I Future Series Costa Rica 2020 - Winners

Badminton in Costa Rica
2020 establishments in Central America